"Forever" is a song by British boy band Damage, released on 7 December 1996 as the third single from their debut album of the same name. The song was a major success on the UK Singles Chart as it made the top 10, peaking at No. 6. In Australia, the song peaked at No. 13 in 1997, becoming the band's most successful release in the region.

Music video
The music video is set against a CGI landscape, set in the clouds. The band appear in a range of oversized jackets, performing the song.

Track listings
CD1
 "Forever" (Radio Edit) - 4:39
 "They Don't Have to Know" (H. Atkins/K. Atkins/Trotman/Simpson/Harriott, produced by Ethnic Boyz)
 "Forever" (Linslee Campbell Mix) - 5:39
 "Damage Groove" (Simpson/Jones/Bromfield/Richards/Harriott, produced by Mark Lewis)

CD2
 "Forever" (Original Mix) - 5:00
 "My Heart Cries" (Simpson/Jones/Bromfield/Richards/Harriott, produced by Mark Lewis) - 5:18
 "Private Thoughts" (A personal message from Damage)

Cassette
 "Forever" (Radio Edit) - 4:39
 "They Don't Have to Know"
 "Private Thoughts" (A personal message from Damage)

12-inch vinyl
 "Forever" (Radio Edit) - 4:39
 "They Don't Have to Know"
 "Be My Baby" (Terri Robinson, Dominic Owen, Fabian Hamilton, produced by High Class)

Charts

Weekly charts

Year-end charts

References

External links
[ AllMusic biography]

1996 songs
1996 singles
Damage (British band) songs
Contemporary R&B ballads
Songs written by Ali Tennant
Songs written by Wayne Hector
Songs written by Steve Mac
Song recordings produced by Steve Mac
Big Life Records singles
1990s ballads